Memory game may refer to:-

 Memory Game, a 1971 US game show
 The Memory Game, a psychological thriller by Nicci Gerrard and Sean French
 "The Memory Game" (Rosanne), an episode of the US sitcom Roseanne
 Concentration (card game), a game where pairs of face-down cards must be matched
 Memory sport, competitive memorisation events